A partial solar eclipse will occur on Tuesday, December 7, 2094. A solar eclipse occurs when the Moon passes between Earth and the Sun, thereby totally or partly obscuring the image of the Sun for a viewer on Earth. A partial solar eclipse occurs in the polar regions of the Earth when the center of the Moon's shadow misses the Earth.
It will be visible across North America.

Related eclipses

Solar eclipses 2094–2098

Saros 124

References

External links 
 http://eclipse.gsfc.nasa.gov/SEplot/SEplot2051/SE2094Dec07P.GIF

2094 12 7
2094 in science
2094 12 7
2094 12 7